Cassandra Lynn Hensley (née Jensen, previously D'Elia, August 15, 1979 – January 15, 2014) was an American model and is Playboy's Playmate of the Month for February 2006. At age eighteen, Hensley moved to Newport Beach, California to study to become an aesthetician. She also opened a tanning salon and did some modeling. After placing in the Top 20 in a Hawaiian Tropic pageant, she submitted photos to Playboy. It was not until the second time she submitted photos that she received a callback and became a Playmate. She made an appearance on the television series Bikini Destinations in 2008.

Hensley was born in Price, Utah. She was found dead of an apparent overdose, in the bathtub at a friend's home in Los Angeles, California, on January 15, 2014.

References

2000s Playboy Playmates
1979 births
2014 deaths
People from Price, Utah
People from Newport Beach, California